Bucculatrix speciosa is a moth in the family Bucculatricidae. It is found in North America, where it has been recorded from Indiana and West Virginia. It was first described in 1963 by Annette Frances Braun.

The wingspan is about 8-8.5 mm. The forewings are dull brown, except for the dull greyish basal dorsal area. The hindwings are fuscous. Adults have been recorded on wing in July.

The larvae feed on Solidago species. They mine the leaves of their host plant. The mine is linear. Older larvae leave the mine and feed on the underside of the leaf. Pupation takes place in a white cocoon which may be spun on a stem of the host plant near the inflorescence, on the underside of a leaf, or on debris on the ground.

References

Natural History Museum Lepidoptera generic names catalog

Bucculatricidae
Moths described in 1963
Moths of North America
Taxa named by Annette Frances Braun